The Battle of San Domingo was the last fleet engagement of the Napoleonic Wars, contested off the Southern coast of the Spanish colonial Captaincy General of Santo Domingo, then under French occupation, on 6 February 1806. A British squadron of seven ships of the line under Vice-Admiral Sir John Thomas Duckworth surprised and destroyed a French squadron of five ships of the line led by Contre-amiral (Rear Admiral) Corentin Urbain Leissègues as the French sailed westwards along the San Domingo coast. Using his superior numbers and speed, Duckworth struck at the head of the French line with his leading ships while the slower eastern division of his squadron intercepted and captured the French stragglers. The only French ships to escape were two frigates and a corvette – three ships of the line were captured and two destroyed, including Leissègues' flagship, the 120-gun Impérial.  French casualties were estimated as more than 1,500 men killed and wounded and the British suffered nearly 350 casualties in the engagement, which lasted for just over two hours.

Leissègues' squadron had escaped from Brest on 13 December 1805, taking advantage of a lapse in the British blockade. Sailing with another squadron under Contre-amiral Jean-Baptiste Willaumez, Leissègues separated from Willaumez after two days and passed north of the Azores, where his ships were damaged and scattered by winter storms. Sailing for Santo Domingo to reconstitute his squadron and make urgent repairs, Leissègues arrived on 20 January 1806. Duckworth had been tasked with watching the remnants of the French and Spanish fleets in Cádiz following the Battle of Trafalgar in October 1805, but in November had gone hunting to the south in search of a French raiding squadron and on his route back to his station had encountered a frigate that reported the escape of Leissègues and Willaumez. Sailing in pursuit, Duckworth encountered Willaumez on 25 December but refused battle and instead sailed for the West Indies to replenish his supplies before making the journey back to European waters. News reached him of the French arrival while anchored at Basseterre on 1 February and he immediately sailed to investigate, joined by part of the West Indies squadron under Rear-Admiral Alexander Cochrane.

British squadron
Duckworth's squadron was principally formed from his original Cádiz squadron, except for HMS Powerful which had been sent to the Indian Ocean in December 1805, and with the addition of two ships from the West Indies squadron under Cochrane, HMS Northumberland and HMS Atlas. Frigates and smaller craft joined the fleet as it sailed north through the Leeward Islands, but none were engaged during the battle itself except to act as tows for the more seriously damaged ships of the line. As he approached the French line, Duckworth separated his force into two divisions: a western force to windward under Duckworth himself and a slower eastern force led by Duckworth's second in command Rear-Admiral Thomas Louis. During the engagement the divisions became separated and as a result Duckworth's division fought the strongest French forces at the head of the line. Louis was initially engaged with the French rear, but later assisted his commander against the huge Impérial during the final stages of the battle. British casualties were recorded in detail in Duckworth's despatches, based on the returns of each ship, although they were not evenly distributed: HMS Agamemnon arrived late in the battle and suffered minimal losses, while Northumberland was heavily engaged with the French flagship and suffered correspondingly severe casualties.

French squadron
Contre-amiral Leissègues' squadron was unchanged from the force that left Brest on 13 December. Recognising that if he was caught at anchor he would be destroyed, Leissègues sent orders from his offices in Santo Domingo for the fleet to sail, joining them later by small boat. Trapped against the land with the wind from the west, Leissègues had no option but to form a line of battle and wait to meet the British squadron. Although his ships fought hard, they were unable to mutually support one another and were rapidly overwhelmed: three surrendered, while Diomède and Impérial were driven ashore and wrecked to prevent their capture. The only ships to escape were the two frigates and a corvette that and slipped between the French line and the land early in the battle and made sail to the west, eventually reaching France.

French casualties are hard to calculate, as the best available source is the vague totals submitted by Duckworth in his account to the Admiralty. He estimates, apparently based on reports by the senior remaining French officers on Alexandre, Jupiter and Brave, that those three ships suffered 760 casualties in total. These accounts were subsequently called into question by historian William James, who considered them too high. James also criticised the assumed totals for Impérial and Diomède, which are even less certain but reportedly totalled 500 and 250 respectively. In addition to those killed and wounded, the entire surviving crews of Alexandre, Jupiter and Brave were taken prisoner, as were 150 men from Diomède and six from Impérial seized by British boarding parties on 8 February.

References

Bibliography
 
 
 
 
 
 

Napoleonic Wars orders of battle
Atlantic campaign of 1806
Battles of the Spanish reconquest of Santo Domingo